Acropora capillaris is a species of acroporid coral found in the Red Sea.

References

Acropora
Corals described in 1879